Dipeptidyl-peptidase 3 is an enzyme that in humans is encoded by the DPP3 gene.

This gene encodes a protein that is a member of the S9B family in clan SC of the serine proteases. This cytoplasmic protein binds a single zinc ion with its zinc-binding motif (HELLGH) and has post-proline dipeptidyl aminopeptidase activity, cleaving Xaa-Pro dipeptides from the N-termini of proteins. Increased activity of this protein is associated with endometrial and ovarian cancers. Alternate transcriptional splice variants have been characterized.

References

Further reading

External links